Jacqueline Audry (25 September 1908 – 22 June 1977) was a French film director who began making films in post-World War II France and specialised in literary adaptations. She was the first commercially successful female director of post-war France.

Biography
Audry was born in Orange, Vaucluse, France. Because there were few opportunities for female directors during the Nazi occupation, Audry worked as an assistant to directors Jean Delannoy, G. W. Pabst and Max Ophüls and directed a short film of her own, Le Feu de paille (1943), with the help of the Centre Artistique et Technique des Jeunes du Cinéma (now La Femis). The end of World War II and the liberation of France provided increased opportunities for women, but they still faced prejudice in the film industry.

Audry's first feature film was Les Malheurs de Sophie (1946). This was based on the popular novel of the same name by the Comtesse de Ségur. No copies of this film, which was censored for its "politically inappropriate" riot scenes, exist. Unable to raise funds for her next film, she had to wait a couple of years before making Sombre dimanche (1948). In the 1940s and 1950s, she directed three films based on Colette novels; Gigi (1949), Minne (1950) and Mitsou (1956), all three with actress Danièle Delorme. Mitsou, which featured sex outside of marriage, was heavily censored.

Audry directed The Pit of Loneliness (Olivia, 1951), based on Dorothy Bussy's 1950 semi-autobiographical novel, Olivia. Set in an all-girls boarding school, The Pit of Loneliness depicts a lesbian love story between a schoolgirl and her headmistress. At the time, the film was very controversial and was censored in the United States and the United Kingdom. Edwige Feuillère was nominated for a BAFTA award for Best Foreign Actress for her part as Mlle. Julie, the headmistress. The film has been called a "landmark of lesbian representation". She frequently collaborated with her sister, the novelist and screenwriter Colette Audry.

Audry's film style was traditional and at odds with the French New Wave. Her films had a feminist slant however. Many of them had central female characters and they often gave a radical view of gender roles and female sexuality. Audry retired from feature films after Bitter Fruit (1967), but she co-directed with Wojciech Solarz a Polish-French miniseries of the life of Honoré de Balzac in 1973. Audry died in a road accident in Poissy, Yvelines, France in 1977.

She was married to the screenwriter Pierre Laroche with whom she collaborated on film scripts on a number of occasions.

Filmography

Among the 16 films Audry directed were:
 The Misfortunes of Sophie (1946)
 Dark Sunday (1948)
 Gigi (1949)
  (1950)
 Olivia (US title: The Pit of Loneliness) (1951)
 The Blonde Gypsy (1953)
 Huis clos (No Exit) (1954)
 Mitsou (1956)
 It's All Adam's Fault (1958)
 School for Coquettes (1958)
 Le Secret du chevalier d'Éon (1959)
 Girl on the Road (1962)
 Bitter Fruit (1967)

See also
 List of female film and television directors
 List of LGBT-related films directed by women

References

External links
Retrospective with photos, posters, scripts, and documentation:  
Bio, photos, clips:  
Bio:  Clips:  

Allmovie

1908 births
1977 deaths
People from Orange, Vaucluse
French women film directors
French film directors
Road incident deaths in France
20th-century French women